Cyprus national football team results may refer to:
 Cyprus national football team results (unofficial matches), for the list of unofficial matches
Cyprus national football team results (1960-1969) for the list of results between 1960 and 1969
Cyprus national football team results (1970-1989) for the list of results between 1970 and 1989
 Cyprus national football team results (1990–2009) for the list of results between 1990 and 2009
 Cyprus national football team results (2010–2019), for the list of results between 2010 and 2019
 Cyprus national football team results (2020–29), for the list of results from 2020 onwards